Tatsuno Station is the name of two train stations in Japan:

 Tatsuno Station (Nagano) (辰野駅)
 Tatsuno Station (Hyōgo) (竜野駅)